WBMA-LD (channel 58) is a low-power television station in Birmingham, Alabama, United States, affiliated with ABC. It is owned by Sinclair Broadcast Group alongside MyNetworkTV affiliate WABM (channel 68) and Homewood-licensed CW affiliate WTTO (channel 21); Sinclair also operates Bessemer-licensed WDBB (channel 17), which serves as a full satellite station of WTTO, under a local marketing agreement (LMA) with Sinclair partner company Cunningham Broadcasting. However, Sinclair effectively owns WDBB as the majority of Cunningham's stock is owned by the family of deceased group founder Julian Smith.

WBMA-LD, WABM and WTTO share studios at the Riverchase office park on Concourse Parkway in Hoover (with a Birmingham mailing address); WBMA-LD's transmitter is located atop Red Mountain (near the Tarpley City neighborhood) in southwestern Birmingham.

WBMA transmits a low-power signal, which even in digital effectively limits its over-the-air radius to Birmingham proper and nearby areas in Jefferson, Tuscaloosa, Walker, Bibb and Shelby counties. Because of this, the station's programming is simulcast on the digital subchannels of three other Central Alabama stations that act as full-power relays—including those of WABM and WDBB—in order to reach the entire Birmingham–Tuscaloosa–Anniston market.

The station's brand name, "ABC 33/40", is derived from the two stations that operated as full-power satellites of WBMA to distribute its programming to southwestern and northeastern areas of central Alabama from the station's acquisition of the ABC affiliation in September 1996 until October 2014, WCFT-TV (channel 33) in Tuscaloosa and WJSU-TV (channel 40) in Anniston, which now respectively operate as Heroes & Icons affiliates WSES and WGWW (the latter of which simulcasts WBMA-LD on its second subchannel through a time brokerage agreement with Sinclair partner company and current owner of the two stations, Howard Stirk Holdings). The moniker remains in use largely due to its continued carriage over channel assignments originally given to its ex-satellites—and now assigned to its subchannel relays—on multichannel television providers throughout Central Alabama outside of Greater Birmingham (primarily non-cable-based services like the IPTV-based U-verse, and satellite providers DirecTV and Dish Network).

Stations
While WBMA is technically considered the main station and official ABC affiliate for the Birmingham–Tuscaloosa–Anniston market, the signal of the low-powered WBMA is simulcast on the digital subchannels of three full-powered stations within the market to ensure adequate reception across central Alabama and some adjacent areas. Nielsen Media Research treats WBMA and its subchannel-based simulcast feeds as one station in local ratings books, using the identifier name WBMA+. For the sake of brevity, the station will be referred to hereafter in this article by that name, when referencing the station and its repeaters (including those it maintained prior to the 2014 sale of the present-day WSES and WGWW to Howard Stirk Holdings).

Former

Notes:
 1. WBMA-LD used the callsign W58CK until 1997, at which time the callsign was officially changed to WBMA-LP.
 2. WSES used the callsign WCFT-TV from its 1965 inception until 2015. WSES operated as an independent station from 1965 to 1970, and as a CBS affiliate from 1970 to 1996.
 3. The Broadcasting and Cable Yearbook states that WCFT-TV signed on October 27, while the Television and Cable Factbook states it signed on October 29.
 4. WGWW used the callsign WHMA-TV from its 1969 inception until 1984, and callsign WJSU-TV from 1984 until 2015. It was a CBS affiliate from 1969 to 1996, with a secondary NBC affiliation from 1969 to 1970.
 5. WBMA-LD is simulcast on WABM-DT2, WDBB-DT2 and WGWW-DT2.

History

Early history and formation of trimulcast with WCFT-TV and WJSU-TV
On May 5, 1994, Great American Communications (which would be renamed Citicasters following the completion of its debt restructuring later that year) agreed to sell Birmingham's longtime ABC affiliate, WBRC-TV (channel 6), and three of its sister stations (fellow ABC affiliate WGHP in High Point, North Carolina, NBC affiliate WDAF-TV in Kansas City, and CBS affiliate KSAZ-TV in Phoenix) to New World Communications for $350 million in cash and $10 million in share warrants. As part of a broader deal between New World and the Fox Broadcasting Company signed on May 23 of that year, New World agreed to affiliate five of its eight existing television stations and the four it had acquired from Great American with Fox, in a series of affiliation transactions that would take two years to complete due to the varying conclusion dates of their ongoing contracts with either ABC, NBC or CBS. Three weeks later, New World agreed to buy NBC affiliate WVTM-TV (channel 13) and three other stations from Argyle Television Holdings (CBS affiliates KDFW in Dallas–Fort Worth and KTBC in Austin, and ABC affiliate KTVI in St. Louis), in a purchase option-structured deal worth $717 million. Due to conflicts with FCC ownership rules of the time period, New World subsequently decided to establish and transfer the licenses of WBRC and WGHP into a trust company, with the intent to sell them to the Fox network's broadcasting subsidiary, Fox Television Stations (in the case of Birmingham, New World could not keep WBRC and WVTM since the FCC then forbade a single company from owning two television stations in the same market; the concurrent Argyle and Citicasters acquisitions also put New World three stations over the FCC's twelve-station ownership limit).

Although the sales of WBRC and WGHP were finalized on July 24, 1995, Fox Television Stations could not switch WBRC's network affiliation in the short-term, as the station's contract with ABC would not expire until August 31, 1996. While this forced Fox to operate WBRC as an ABC affiliate for thirteen months after the sale's closure, it gave the latter network enough time to find a new central Alabama affiliate. ABC first approached WTTO (channel 21, now a CW affiliate) – which, along with semi-satellites WDBB (channel 17) in Tuscaloosa and WNAL-TV (channel 44, now Ion Television owned-and-operated station WPXH-TV) in Gadsden, was set to lose its Fox affiliation to channel 6 – for a deal to replace WBRC as its Birmingham outlet. However, the owner of WTTO, Sinclair Broadcast Group, only expressed interest in carrying ABC's prime time and news programming. It also refused to launch a news department for WTTO, as the group did not factor local news production into its corporate budget at the time (this was despite the fact that sister station WDBB had maintained a standalone news operation at the time ABC started negotiations with WTTO, which was eventually shut down when the former switched to a full-time WTTO simulcast in December 1995).

In November 1995, Allbritton Communications purchased CBS affiliate WCFT-TV (channel 33) in Tuscaloosa from Federal Broadcasting for $20 million; it concurrently signed a deal with Fant Broadcasting to assume operational responsibilities for WNAL-TV under a local marketing agreement. Then in January 1996, after it terminated the WNAL deal, Allbritton acquired the non-license assets of CBS affiliate WJSU-TV (channel 40) in Anniston from Osborne Communications Corporation for $12 million (through an LMA arrangement which included an option to eventually purchase the station outright).

Shortly after the WJSU purchase took place, ABC reached a unique deal with Allbritton, in which WCFT and WJSU would become the new ABC affiliates for Central Alabama, with WCFT acting as the main station. ABC had a very strong relationship with Allbritton, particularly as Allbritton's flagship station, WJLA-TV in Washington, D.C., had long been one of ABC's highest-rated affiliates. In April 1996, a few months after the Birmingham deal was struck, Allbritton's ties to ABC were sealed wholesale when Allbritton reached a ten-year affiliation agreement with ABC that renewed contracts with the group's five existing ABC affiliates (WJLA-TV, WSET-TV in Lynchburg, Virginia, KATV in Little Rock, Arkansas, KTUL in Tulsa, Oklahoma, and WHTM in Harrisburg, Pennsylvania; WHTM was in the process of being acquired by Allbritton at the time of the deal) and resulted in two of its other stations switching to the network (NBC affiliate WCIV [now Heroes & Icons affiliate WGWG] in Charleston, South Carolina, and WB affiliate WBSG-TV [now Ion Television owned-and-operated station WPXC-TV] in Brunswick, Georgia, the latter of which would become a satellite of WJXX in nearby Jacksonville, Florida, when Allbritton signed that station on in February 1997).

A key problem with the deal, however, was that under Nielsen rules, neither WCFT nor WJSU would likely be counted in the Birmingham ratings books as it had designated Tuscaloosa and Anniston as separate markets at the time. Allbritton's solution to this issue was to purchase W58CK, a low-power independent station in Birmingham that began operations on November 18, 1994 (under the ownership of Shirley James), which would serve as the primary station for the purpose of being counted in local ratings diaries. While the purchase of channel 58 was not a condition of the deal between ABC and Allbritton, it did pave the way for Anniston and Tuscaloosa to be consolidated back into the Birmingham television market in September 1998 (at the start of the 1998–99 television season). That move benefited all of the major Birmingham stations, as it not only increased their viewership in Tuscaloosa and Anniston, but also resulted in Birmingham's placement in Nielsen's national market rankings jumping twelve spots from 51st to 39th place.

W58CK became an ABC affiliate on September 1, 1996, at which time WCFT and WJSU also ended separate operations and became full-powered satellite stations of W58CK, with Allbritton assuming control of WJSU's operations under the originally proposed LMA, which was transferred to Flagship Broadcasting upon that company's purchase of that station (Allbritton would eventually purchase WJSU-TV outright in 2008). The respective studio facilities of both stations – located near Skyland Boulevard in Tuscaloosa and on Noble Street in downtown Anniston – were converted into news bureaus, with their master control operations being migrated to W58CK's new studios on Concourse Parkway in Hoover. WCFT and WJSU also ceded the CBS programming rights in central Alabama to WBMG (channel 42, now WIAT), which had recently upgraded its transmitter to provide a much stronger full-power signal throughout much of the Birmingham market, and WNAL-TV, which took over as CBS's northeastern Alabama affiliate on the day of the WBRC/WBMA+/WTTO switch.

Even though WBMA was the official ABC affiliate for the Birmingham market, Allbritton chose to brand the combined operation as "ABC 33/40", using the over-the-air channel numbers of WCFT and WJSU instead, making it appear as if WCFT was the primary station. The three stations' combined signal footprint covered the majority of Central Alabama (with the exception of certain areas to the immediate north and south of Jefferson County that could not receive a Grade B signal from W58CK/WBMA or the Tuscaloosa and Anniston satellites) and provided at least secondary coverage from the Alabama–Georgia state line westward to Columbus, Mississippi. Cable (and eventually, satellite) providers within the market usually picked up the signal of either WCFT or WJSU, both of which provided at least secondary coverage of Birmingham's inner ring.

Its original slogan for its first ten years as an ABC affiliate was "We're [Always] Building Our Station Around You", which unlike most advertising catchphrases, was quite accurate; the station's programming consultants surveyed a large number of central Alabama residents to literally build a new station from the ground up, catering to the interests of its potential viewers. At the time it joined the network, WCFT began serving as the default ABC affiliate for the Columbus–Tupelo market; this lasted until WKDH signed on as the market's ABC station in 2001 (WKDH shut down in 2013 following the termination of a local marketing agreement with NBC affiliate WTVA, which took over the ABC affiliation on a digital subchannel). W58CK, which had been informally been using the WBMA calls from the time it began operations, officially changed its call letters to WBMA-LP on September 23, 1997.

In June 1998, ABC parent The Walt Disney Company entered into negotiations to purchase the eight Allbritton stations and the LMAs with WJSU and WJXX, reportedly offering the company more than $1 billion to acquire them (which if successful, would have made WBMA+ the Birmingham market's third network-owned station, alongside WBRC and WVTM, which operated as an NBC O&O from 1996 – when New World sold it to NBC Television Stations on May 22 of that year – until 2006, and Birmingham the smallest American television market with at least three major network O&Os). Negotiations between Disney and Allbritton broke down when the former dropped out of discussions to buy the stations the following month.

Between May 26, 2008 and March 23, 2009, Nielsen Media Research mistakenly undercounted viewership for WBMA+ in its diary ratings tallies. Due to a "procedural error", ratings for WBMA-LP, and WCFT and WJSU respectively (which were traditionally measured collectively as "WBMA+" due to the unique trimulcast structure) failed to properly measure viewership through the three stations' digital signals – the feeds that were also distributed to local cable and satellite providers – together and combine them with ratings counts for their analog signals, resulting in ratings for WBMA's digital signal only being counted. The error significantly reduced the total viewership and ratings share estimates recorded to less than half of what station management expected. It was later explained that Nielsen had undercounted and overcounted the stations' viewership at various times between February 2008 and November 2009, as well as during a period in January 2010 that it had shortchanged WBMA+'s prime time ratings (including the registry of occasional zero shares for some ABC programs). The confusion stemmed from the station's unique three-station simulcasting setup.

Acquisition by Sinclair
For over a decade and a half, WBMA+ maintained a strong relationship with Allbritton, with no major problems arising between the two entities and, likewise, no major changes occurring to the station's operations. On July 29, 2013, Allbritton announced that it would sell its seven television stations, including WBMA+, to the Sinclair Broadcast Group (which would purchase the stations for $985 million), in an attempt by the company to shift its focus toward co-owned political news website, Politico. As part of the deal, Sinclair had intended to sell the license assets of its existing Birmingham stations, CW affiliate WTTO and MyNetworkTV affiliate WABM (channel 68) to Deerfield Media, and retain operational responsibilities for those stations through shared services and joint sales agreements. At the time, no affiliation changes were expected.

On December 6, 2013, the FCC informed Sinclair that applications related to the deal need to be "amended or withdrawn," as Sinclair would retain an existing time brokerage agreement between WTTO and its satellite station, WDBB (channel 17); this would, in effect, create a new LMA between WBMA+ and WDBB, even though the Commission had ruled in 1999 that such agreements made after November 5, 1996 covering the programming of more than 15% of a station's broadcast day would count toward the ownership limits for the brokering station's owner. A sale of WBMA and its satellites to a separate buyer was also not an option for Sinclair, as Allbritton wanted its stations to be sold together to limit the tax rate that the company would have had to pay from the accrued proceeds, which it estimated would have been substantially higher if the group was sold piecemeal.

On March 20, 2014, as part of a restructuring of the Sinclair-Allbritton deal in order to address these ownership conflicts as well as to expedite the Allbritton acquisition because of them due to the FCC's increased scrutiny of outsourcing agreements used to circumvent in-market ownership caps, Sinclair announced that it would retain ownership of WTTO (choosing to retain the LMA between that station and WDBB, and continue operating it as a satellite station of WTTO), and form a new duopoly between it and WBMA+; WABM was to be sold to a third-party buyer with which Sinclair would not enter into an operational outsourcing arrangement or maintain any contingent interest, other than a possible transitional shared facilities agreement until WTTO was able to move its operations from its longtime home on Beacon Parkway West to WBMA's facility in Hoover.

On May 29, 2014, however, Sinclair informed the FCC that it had not found a buyer for WABM (even among the market's three existing major station owners, WBRC owner Raycom Media, then-WVTM owner Media General and then-WIAT owner LIN Media, neither of which operated an existing duopoly station in the Birmingham market, although the latter two groups were in the process of merging at the time, with Media General eventually selling WVTM to Hearst Television) and proposed surrendering the licenses of WCFT and WJSU to the agency. Under the restructured plan, WABM would become the main ABC affiliate for central Alabama, with WBMA-LD becoming its repeater. WABM's existing programming would move to its second digital channel on 58.2 (WBMA-LD itself, as a low-power station, would not be affected as FCC rules allow the ownership of one or more low-power and up to two full-power stations regardless of market ownership caps for duopolies). Sinclair opted to retain WABM on the basis that its transmission facilities are superior to those of WCFT and WJSU; indeed, moving ABC programming to WABM would have given ABC a full-power affiliate in Birmingham itself for the first time since 1996. After nearly a year of delays, Sinclair's deal to acquire Allbritton was approved by the FCC on July 24, 2014, and was completed on August 1, 2014.

Sale of WCFT and WJSU to Howard Stirk Holdings
On September 18, 2014, in preparation for the planned shutdown of WCFT and WJSU eleven days later on September 29, WDBB and WABM added a simulcast feed of WBMA-LD on their respective second digital subchannels (17.2 and 68.2). WJSU officially signed off at 10:35 p.m. on September 29, 2014; in addition to being available on the second digital subchannels of WABM and WDBB, WCFT-TV continued to simulcast WBMA-LD on its main channel in the interim.

On September 24, 2014, Sinclair filed an application with the FCC to sell the license assets of WCFT to Howard Stirk Holdings (owned by conservative political commentator Armstrong Williams, who has ties to Sinclair as his political affairs program, The Right Side, airs on many of the group's stations and is produced at the studios of its Baltimore flagship station WBFF) for $50,000, foregoing any operational agreements with the company for the station. Sinclair had reached a similar deal to sell WCIV in Charleston – another station that was set to be shut down as a result of a similar arrangement involving its MyNetworkTV affiliate in that market, WMMP, due to a grandfathered LMA that station maintained (and subsequently decided to terminate) with Fox affiliate WTAT – to the same company.

As a result of the WCFT/HSH deal, WCFT remained on the air past its scheduled September 29 sign-off date. In addition, as the sale of WJSU-TV in effect superseded the proposed surrender of its license, Sinclair requested that the FCC hold off on canceling the license until at least ten business days after acting on the proposed transaction. In order for Sinclair to continue operating WJSU and WCFT and maintain their existing licenses until the FCC ruled on the petition and the sale to HSH, the two stations began providing interim programming as affiliates of Heartland (which they both previously carried on their third digital subchannels as WBMA satellites) on October 20, 2014; at that time, WJSU was essentially converted into a satellite of WCFT. WBMA-LD's main ABC programming and its "James Spann 24/7 Weather" channel were restored on WJSU's second and third subchannels on December 3, 2014. The FCC approved the transfer of license of WCFT-TV and WJSU-TV to Howard Stirk Holdings the following day on December 4.

Even though WGWW (the call letters assigned by Howard Stirk to the former WJSU-TV on March 11, 2015, at which time WCFT also changed its calls to WSES) is the only one of the two original satellites that continues to relay WBMA's programming, the station continues to identify by "ABC 33/40" as an artifact brand as most central Alabamians still refer to WBMA+ by either that name or "[channel] 33/40", as well as the fact that the station is carried on either channel on AT&T U-verse, DirecTV and Dish Network in the market. With WDBB, WABM and WGWW relegating the station's ABC programming to digital subchannels, WBMA-LD became the largest Big Four network affiliate by market size to rely on digital multicasting for full market distribution over-the-air (in addition to its existing status as the largest low-power Big Four affiliate overall), as well as making Birmingham one of the only U.S. television markets where all but one of the six major broadcast networks (in this case, CBS, NBC, Fox, The CW and MyNetworkTV) maintain primary channel affiliations on full-power stations, while the remaining network (ABC) is only available through low-power and digital multicast affiliations (the latter status since been surpassed by WBTS-LD in Boston, when it became an NBC owned-and-operated station – the only Big Four O&O originating on a low-power signal – in January 2017).

Programming
In addition to carrying the entire ABC schedule, syndicated programming broadcast by WBMA-LD includes Sherri, Family Feud and Wheel of Fortune. Birmingham is one of the few U.S. markets to air Wheel of Fortune and its sister game show Jeopardy! on separate stations; Jeopardy! airs on CBS affiliate WIAT.

In September 2006, WBMA+ moved the popular soap opera All My Children from 10:00 a.m. (where the program had aired since channel 58 as well as the former WCFT and WJSU assumed the ABC affiliation in September 1996) to 12:00 p.m. From the time of its switch to ABC until the timeslot change, the station had aired All My Children on a day-behind delayed basis, in the continuation of a practice instituted by WBRC throughout its final 26 years as an ABC affiliate, starting with the soap opera's premiere in 1970. The move to the noon timeslot marked the second time since All My Children debuted on ABC that the show had aired in pattern in the Birmingham market, having aired at 11:30 a.m. from July 1975 until the show expanded to an hour in 1977; The Chew, which replaced AMC after it ended its 41-year run in September 2011, also aired at noon until the show's cancellation in June 2018.

On April 30, 1997, WBMA+ decided that it would not air "The Puppy Episode", an episode of the ABC sitcom Ellen that gained notoriety for Ellen DeGeneres' character Ellen Morgan (and in effect, DeGeneres herself) coming out as a lesbian, after ABC declined a request by station management to air the episode on tape delay in a late-night timeslot. Jerry Heilman, then-general manager of the WBMA trimulcast, cited a need to respect the family values of the region's largely conservative evangelical community as the basis of its decision. Some gay rights and civil libertarian activists decried the decision as a blatant example of censorship; in response, per a request by the LGBT organizations GLAAD and locally based Birmingham Pride Alabama, ABC downlinked a special satellite feed of the episode's broadcast to the Boutwell Memorial Auditorium in downtown Birmingham that was viewed by about 1,000 people, mainly local gay and lesbian persons, and their supporters. Some area cable providers also carried the network feed of the episode by way of out-of-market ABC affiliates such as WSB-TV in Atlanta. WBMA+ would eventually air the episode when it was re-aired by the network later that same season.

News operation
, WBMA+ presently broadcasts 32 hours of locally produced newscasts each week (with six hours each weekday and one hour each on Saturdays and Sundays). In addition, the station produces the hour-long infotainment program Talk of Alabama, which airs weekday mornings at 9:00 a.m., and the half-hour sports highlight and discussion program The Zone, which airs on Sunday nights following the 10:00 p.m. newscast; since September 2015, a daily extension of the latter program has also aired on Monday through Thursday nights on WTTO/WDBB.

News department history
After the announcement that W58CK would become Birmingham's ABC affiliate, then-owner Allbritton Communications agreed to invest in an in-house news department for the station. It moved the operations of W58CK, WCFT-TV and WJSU-TV into a new studio facility at the Riverchase complex near Hoover, a digital-capable building that was equipped with more than $2 million of Philips digital equipment for newsgathering and signal transmission. W58CK's newly created news department effectively took over newscast production for WCFT and WJSU; the latter two stations concurrently discontinued their in-house newscasts (which had focused their news coverage on their respective cities of license, and surrounding areas near Tuscaloosa and Anniston) and shut down their separate news departments on August 31, 1996. Incidentally, one main reason that ABC approached WCFT and WJSU to become its new central Alabama affiliate was that both were the only remaining stations in the market with functioning news departments.

W58CK began airing regular long-form newscasts once it became an ABC affiliate the following day on September 1, beginning with that evening's 5:00 p.m. newscast; the station's newscasts were originally branded as The (airtime) News on Alabama's ABC 33/40, before eventually being shortened to the unified ABC 33/40 News in 2001. At that time, the station launched a full slate of local news programming – airing newscasts at 5:30 a.m., noon, 5:00, 6:00 and 10:00 p.m. on Monday through Fridays (the late newscast being then titled The Night Team on Alabama's ABC 33/40), along with weekend evening newscasts. WCFT and WJSU began simulcasting its newscasts on that date, following their conversion into satellite stations of channel 58 as part of the "ABC 33/40" trimulcast operation.

W58CK maintained certain primary personnel from WCFT and WJSU's news staffs that Allbritton had transferred from those stations to the new combined operation, including respected veteran WCFT anchor Dave Baird. (Baird served as co-anchor of the weeknight newscasts from the new station's debut, until his retirement in 2017.) In addition, the station hired many well-known Birmingham television personalities to work as part of its news staff in the run-up to the department's launch; among them were news anchors Brenda Ladun and Linda Mays, sports anchor Mike Raita, and meteorologists James Spann and Mark Prater, all of whom had previously worked at rival WBRC during the latter years of its ABC affiliation, and former WVTM-TV news personalities Pam Huff and Tracy Haynes, who were later hired to anchor the station's morning newscasts. On September 11, 2006, the station moved its midday newscast to 11:00 a.m. and expanded it into an hour-long broadcast, as a result of the move of All My Children into the newscast's former timeslot.

Although it is a recent entrant in the Birmingham ratings (even though WCFT and WJSU had already established news departments prior to becoming satellites of WBMA-LD), WBMA+'s newscasts have fared much better than those of other upstart news departments created following affiliation deals resulting from the Fox-New World agreement, especially considering WBMA+ is more dependent on cable and satellite than the market’s other major stations. Its news department quickly established itself as formidable competition to those of its rivals in the Birmingham market, differing from other stations that became Big Three affiliates resulting from affiliation switches spurred by Fox's acquisition of the NFL rights. Many of these fledgling newscasts have continued to place last in the ratings to this day. The station spent much of the late 1990s and 2000s in a spirited battle with WVTM for second place in the market behind longtime leader WBRC. In recent years, WBMA+ has regularly traded the runner-up spot in the market with a resurgent WIAT after viewership for WVTM's newscasts gradually dropped to fourth place following NBC's 2006 sale of the station to Media General. Much of the early success it achieved with its newscasts was due to the hirings of well-known talent as well as its extensive coverage of severe weather events affecting its viewing area.

On January 31, 2010, WBMA+ became the third television news operation in the Birmingham-Tuscaloosa-Anniston market to begin broadcasting their local newscasts in high definition (after WVTM, which upgraded on October 17, 2007, and WBRC, which upgraded on October 26, 2009; WIAT upgraded to the format three months after WBMA+'s conversion, on April 9, 2010). On September 12, 2011, the station debuted an hour-long late-afternoon newscast, Focus @ 4:00, which replaced The Oprah Winfrey Show (which had been airing on WBMA+ from the assumption of the ABC affiliation until it ended its syndication run on September 9, three days prior to the newscast's premiere).

Weather coverage
WBMA+ has placed a significant emphasis on weather in its news coverage and has become known throughout central Alabama for its comprehensive severe weather coverage led by chief meteorologist James Spann, who joined WBMA+ in October 1996, after he chose to leave WBRC following disagreements with station management over Fox's edgier programming. WBMA+ has maintained a long-standing policy to preempt regular programming and run wall-to-wall, uninterrupted severe weather coverage in the event that the National Weather Service Birmingham office issues a tornado warning for any county within its viewing area. The station operates "StormChaser 33/40", a Jeep customized for storm chasing purposes, which is equipped with a dashcam and a computer programmed with software relaying data from several radar sources; and "AirLink 33/40", a helicopter that is normally used for newsgathering, but is also occasionally used to show the paths of violent and long-track tornadoes.

WBMA+ also operates a network of "SkyCam" units throughout Alabama that provide live video as well as weather data from observation sites throughout the state, including downtown Birmingham, Tuscaloosa; Inverness, Gadsden, Jasper, Mount Cheaha, Cullman, Clanton, Gulf Shores, Hamilton, and Huntsville. It also operates a few SkyCam sites in Mississippi, including in Starkville and Columbus, based in locations that presently receive the station via WDBB-DT2 and previously received it through WCFT prior to September 2014. In the latter half of 2013, WBMA+ replaced many of its standard-definition-only SkyCam units with high-definition cameras, and additionally set up new HD SkyCams in the Riverchase Galleria complex (atop the Galleria Tower) in Hoover; atop the Alabama Power Headquarters Building in downtown Birmingham; atop DCH Regional Medical Center in Tuscaloosa; and in several other locations around central Alabama.

Despite being a relatively new station to the Birmingham market, WBMA+ achieved notice among central Alabama viewers as it has captured of several of the most significant weather events in recent state history through both its SkyCams and its tower cameras. On April 27, 2011, the Cullman SkyCam caught footage of a multiple-vortex EF4 tornado that struck the city's downtown area. Later that day, the SkyCam in Tuscaloosa (located atop the Tuscaloosa County Courthouse) captured footage of another EF4 tornado that produced incredible devastation across southeastern portions of that city. Footage of that same tornado as it tracked northeastward into western Jefferson County was captured by the Birmingham SkyCam (located atop the Daniel Building) as it passed through the northwestern suburbs of the city almost an hour later. On December 25, 2012, the Mobile SkyCam (located in Battleship Park) captured the faint image of an EF2 tornado as it struck that city after sunset. On August 31, 2017, the Reform SkyCam (located atop the town's elementary school) captured an EF2 tornado that formed from the remnants of Hurricane Harvey.

Additionally, WBMA+ operates "TowerLink" cameras that are mounted on current and former transmitters of WBMA and its repeater stations, some of which have also played parts in the station's storm coverage. The Birmingham TowerLink camera (located on WBMA-LD's current tower) caught footage of a major power outage in western Birmingham, which indicated the presence of a destructive nighttime F5 tornado that hit the city on April 8, 1998. The Tuscaloosa TowerLink camera (then located on the old WCFT broadcast tower, which was dismantled in 2012) caught footage of an F4 tornado that hit southeastern Tuscaloosa in December 2000, an EF1 tornado near Buhl that spawned from Hurricane Rita in September 2005, and an EF3 tornado that struck southern Tuscaloosa on April 15, 2011. A TowerLink camera is also located on WGWW's transmitter tower in Anniston (it is the only TowerLink camera that has not captured any tornadoes live on-air).

Social media
WBMA+ relies heavily on social media, especially for the dissemination of weather updates, and alerts during severe thunderstorm and winter weather events. The station maintains both a Facebook page and a Twitter feed (as do several members of the station's on-air news staff) which are used to update viewers on local news headlines and weather alerts, as well as to receive feedback from viewers on news stories. Chief meteorologist James Spann has stated that social media makes it easier to warn the public of impending severe weather. Facebook and Twitter were also used in the weeks following the April 27, 2011 tornado outbreak to report – among other things – damage, missing persons and effects of the storm on the people of Alabama. WBMA+ also uses Flickr to post viewer-submitted weather photos, or pictures of severe weather damage. This strong reliance on social media prompted the station to develop an hour-long newscast with Facebook interaction as its basis, Focus @ 4:00, which incorporates viewer responses on stories featured on the program through questions about current events and interesting topics through Facebook and vice versa. The show also helped increase viewership for WBMA+ in the 4:00 p.m. timeslot, due to it being the only local newscast airing at that hour in the Birmingham market.

Notable current on-air staff
 James Spann (AMS Certified Broadcast Meteorologist Seal of Approval) – chief meteorologist; weeknights

Notable former on-air staff
 John Oldshue – meteorologist (1997–2007; left to operate a small business)
 Dave Baird – veteran news broadcaster (retired 2017)

Technical information

Subchannels
The stations' digital signals are multiplexed, however each station (especially WABM and WDBB due to pre-existing affiliations) carries different channel feeds on their digital signals in addition to simulcasts of WBMA-LD and either of its digital subchannels:

Analog-to-digital conversion
Although WBMA-LP was not obligated to shut off its analog signal, as the law exempted low-powered stations from the national transition from analog to digital television broadcasts, the Federal Communications Commission (FCC) encouraged low-power television stations to vacate from high-band UHF channels 52 to 69, as these out-of-core allotments were removed from broadcasting use as a result of the conversion.

On December 3, 2010, the FCC granted WBMA-LP a construction permit to flash-cut its digital signal into operation on UHF channel 40 (formerly occupied by the analog signal of WJSU) and shut down the analog signal. WBMA-LP had a permit to operate on VHF channel 11, but due to possible interference with fellow ABC affiliates WTVM in Columbus, Georgia and WTOK-TV in Meridian, Mississippi (the latter of which transmits on its former analog frequency), the station decided to modify the application to transmit the signal on UHF channel 40. WBMA-LP signed on its low-power digital signal in late May 2011, under the call letters WBMA-LD; through the use of PSIP, digital television receivers display the station's virtual channel as its former UHF analog channel 58.

See also
 WBTS-CD, which uses a similar setup in the Boston, Massachusetts market to provide a full-market NBC O&O to viewers

References

External links

 

BMA-LD
ABC network affiliates
Charge! (TV network) affiliates
Stadium (sports network) affiliates
Hoover, Alabama
Low-power television stations in the United States
Sinclair Broadcast Group
Television channels and stations established in 1996
1996 establishments in Alabama